Mashkoor Hussain Yaad (1925-2017) was an Urdu language Pakistani poet, novelist and scholar who authored several books. His works include Azadi Ki Charagh, a memoir of his experiences of Partition in Eastern Punjab. Yaad won the Pride of Performance in 1999 and the Sitara-i-Imtiaz in 2011 for his contributions to literature.

Biography 
Mashkoor Hussain Yaad was born in 1925, in Dabwali, Hisar of East Punjab (now part of Haryana). He went by the pen name "Yaad", and later added this to his name when he became a poet. At a young age, his family moved to Muzaffarnagar District in Uttar Pradesh, where his father became a police officer. 

He was married first in 1943. Two weeks after Partition in 1947, his house was attacked and 35 of his family members were killed, including his wife and his three-year-old daughter. Only Yaad and his father survived the attack, and both migrated to Multan, Pakistan. 

Yaad died in 2017 at the age of 90. On the occasion of his death, Shehbaz Sharif, the Chief Minister of Punjab at the time, publicly expressed his condolences and said that Yaad's contribution to Urdu literature will be remembered for a long time.

Literary career 
Just before he graduated from school, Yaad became editor of the newspaper Pukar. In his capacity as editor, Yaad was able to closely observe India's independence movement and the Pakistan movement. He also met and interviewed leaders of these movements, including Muhammad Ali Jinnah and Jawaharlal Nehru.

In Pakistan, his literary career was re-launched after he became Professor of Urdu at Government College, Lahore and published Azadi Ki Chiragh. 

Though not a member of Pakistan's Progressive Writers Association, he was friends with many of its members, especially Ahmed Nadeem Qasmi. Qasmi and Yaad even lived in the same neighborhood in Lahore, Samanabad's Zafar Colony, along with the poet and lyricist Qateel Shifai, also a close friend.  

Along with Qasmi and others, Yaad is featured in a recently published compilation of interviews with Pakistan's major literary figures.

Bibliography 
Books by Yaad include:
 Bardasht
 Ghalid Botiqa
 Ghalib Ki Taba-e-nukta Joo
 Goongi Nazmein
 Meer Anees ki Shairana Baseerat 
 Meer-e-Balonsh
 Mutala-e-Dabeer
 Azadi ki Chiragh

Awards and recognition 

 Pride of Performance Award by the President of Pakistan in 1999
 Sitara-i-Imtiaz (Star of Excellence) Award by the President of Pakistan in 2011

References 

1925 births
2017 deaths
Urdu-language writers from Pakistan
Recipients of Sitara-i-Imtiaz